Alexander Myhre Moccia Mathisen (born 24 November 1986) is a retired Norwegian footballer.

Career
Born in Oslo, Mathisen played for the youth team of the Italian side Parma. He made his Norway youth international debut the same year.

In 2004, he made his debut in the Tippeligaen with Vålerenga.

Ahead of the 2008 season, Mathisen joined Aalesund from Vålerenga.

Career statistics

References

External links
 
 
 

1986 births
Living people
Footballers from Oslo
Norwegian people of Italian descent
Association football midfielders
Norwegian footballers
Norway youth international footballers
Norway under-21 international footballers
Vålerenga Fotball players
Aalesunds FK players
Lierse S.K. players
Hønefoss BK players
Eliteserien players
Belgian Pro League players
Norwegian expatriate footballers
Expatriate footballers in Italy
Norwegian expatriate sportspeople in Italy
Expatriate footballers in Belgium
Norwegian expatriate sportspeople in Belgium